The 1975 Tour de Suisse was the 39th edition of the Tour de Suisse cycle race and was held from 12 June to 20 June 1975. The race started in Baden and finished in Affoltern am Albis. The race was won by Roger De Vlaeminck of the Brooklyn team.

General classification

References

1975
Tour de Suisse
June 1975 sports events in Europe
1975 Super Prestige Pernod